Palimna is a genus of longhorn beetles of the subfamily Lamiinae.

 Palimna alorensis Breuning, 1956
 Palimna andamanica Breuning, 1935
 Palimna annulata (Olivier, 1792)
 Palimna formosana (Kano, 1933)
 Palimna fukiena Gressitt, 1951
 Palimna indica Breuning, 1938
 Palimna indosinica Breuning, 1938
 Palimna infausta (Pascoe, 1859)
 Palimna liturata (Bates, 1884)
 Palimna palimnoides (Schwarzer, 1925)
 Palimna persimilis Breuning, 1938
 Palimna rondoni Breuning, 1963
 Palimna subrondoni Breuning, 1964
 Palimna sumatrana Breuning, 1938
 Palimna yunnana Breuning, 1935

References

Ancylonotini